Emaravirus is a genus of negative-strand RNA viruses which infect plants. The plant virus group is the sole genus in the family Fimoviridae. The genus has 21 species.

Structure
Virions of this genus are between 80 and 100 nm and consists of an enveloped ribonucleocapsid that exhibits helical symmetry.

Genome 
The genomes are segmented, consisting of four strands of negative-sense single-stranded RNA.

Phylogenetics
Emaravirus has the closest phylogenetic relationship with members of the genera Orthotospovirus and Orthobunyavirus. The 3' and 5' ends of the genomic RNAs are complementary (similar to viruses of the Bunyavirales order), with the sequence 5'-AGUAGUGUUCUCC-3' at the 5' terminus and 5'-GGAGUUCACUACU-3' at the 3' terminus. However, the number of genome segments and gene sequences distinguishes emaraviruses from bunyaviruses and tenuiviruses.

Taxonomy
The following species are recognized:

References

External links
 
 ICTV report: Fimoviridae

Bunyavirales
Viral plant pathogens and diseases
Virus genera